Craig Moore (born September 8, 1987) is an American basketball player who is currently a member of Princeton 3x3 in the FIBA 3x3 World Tour.

High school 
Moore was a four-year letter winner and was team captain his senior at the Lawrenceville School in Lawrenceville, New Jersey. He finished his prep career with 171 3-pointers and earned all-state honors following his sophomore and junior years.

College career 
Moore played college basketball at Northwestern University from 2005 to 2009. He was named to the Big Ten All-Freshman team following the 2005–06 season when he averaged 6.8 points and 2.3 assists per game, and finished second on the team with 54 3-pointers. He was named honorable mention All-Big Ten in 2007–08 after leading the Big Ten in made 3-pointers per game (3.23), while setting a school record 97 of them in the season. Moore was named a consensus third-team All-Big Ten selection his senior year.  He broke his own school record with 110 3-pointers, finishing his career with 320, fourth all-time in Big Ten history.

Career stats 

Source

Coaching career 
Moore served as an assistant coach for Princeton University in 2011, and for Northwestern during the 2012–13 season. In 2014, Moore was named Director of Basketball Operations for Princeton University men's team.

Professional career 
Moore played for De Friesland Aris in the Netherlands (2009–2010); and for Gaz Metan Medias in Romania (2011–2012). He currently is a member of Princeton 3x3, and is a 3-time National Champion (2014, 2017, 2018) in 3x3 basketball, having competed in two 3x3 World Cups (2014, 2017).

References

External links 
 
 Craig Moore at FIBA 3x3 World Tour
 Craig Moore at RealGM

1987 births
Living people
American expatriate basketball people in the Netherlands
American expatriate basketball people in Romania
American men's 3x3 basketball players
American men's basketball coaches
American men's basketball players
Aris Leeuwarden players
Basketball players from Pennsylvania
CSM Mediaș (basketball) players
Lawrenceville School alumni
Northwestern Wildcats men's basketball coaches
Northwestern Wildcats men's basketball players
People from Doylestown, Pennsylvania
Princeton Tigers men's basketball coaches